This is a list of the most popular given names in South Korea, by birth year and gender for various years in which data is available.

Aside from newborns being given newly popular names, many adults change their names as well, some in order to cast off birth names they feel are old-fashioned. Between 2000 and 2010, a total of 844,615 people (about 1 in every 60 South Koreans) applied to change their names; 730,277 were approved. In 2010, 552 men changed their name to Min-jun, and 1,401 women changed their name to Seo-yeon.

2021

2019

2017

2015

2013

2011

2009

2008

1990

1980

1970

1960

1950

1945

1940

See also
List of Korean given names

References

South Korea
given names popular